Puppet Master vs. Demonic Toys is a 2004 American horror-comedy film based on the characters of Charles Band and Kenneth J. Hall (Puppet Master) and David S. Goyer (Demonic Toys). The film is written by C. Courtney Joyner and directed by Ted Nicolaou.

The film stars Corey Feldman as the great-grandnephew of André Toulon and Vanessa Angel as the head of a toymaking factory who plans to dominate the world using its latest line of holiday products. It was a made-for-TV film that debuted December 18, 2004 on NBC Universal's SyFy.

The movie is a follow-up to 1993's, Dollman vs. Demonic Toys and loosely a follow-up to Puppet Master: The Legacy. It was later followed by 2010’s Puppet Master: Axis of Evil.

Plot
Robert Toulon, the great-grandnephew of André Toulon and his daughter, Alexandra have come into possession of the puppets and manage to bring them to life on Christmas Eve. Their success is noted by an evil toy manufacturer, Erica Sharpe, who is in possession of the demonic toys, but wants the puppets as the toys are not loyal to her. The Demonic toys are being impatient with Erica since they want to commit some murders. An initial attempt to steal the puppets is unsuccessful and only damages them with fire. Robert repairs them with new parts and weapons.

Unhappy, Erica summons the demon, Bael in order to fulfill her plans of using many demonic toys to cause mass murder and gain control of the puppets. The demon agrees, but only if she brings him Alexandra. She succeeds in kidnapping the girl, making it necessary for Robert to come to her rescue with the aid of a police sergeant, Jessica Russell and the puppets. The group is able to overwhelm and destroy the toys, as well as rescue Alexandra. Since Erica was unable to keep her end of the deal, Bael takes her to hell without fulfilling her evil plans. As the human and puppet survivors go off to enjoy Christmas Day, Baby Oopsie Daisy is shown to have survived. Baby Oopsie Daisy tells everyone Merry Christmas.

Cast
 Corey Feldman as Robert Toulon
 Danielle Keaton as Alexandra Toulon
 Vanessa Angel as Erica Sharpe
 Silvia Suvadova as Sergeant Jessica Russell
 Nikoli Sotirov as Julian
 Dessislava Maicheva as Christina
 Velizar Binev as Mayor
 Angelina Hadjimitova as Claudia
 Anton Falk as Bael
 Rendan Ramsey as Baby Oopsy Daisy

Featured puppets
 Blade
 Pinhead
 Jester
 Six Shooter

Featured toys
 Baby Oopsy Daisy
 Jack Attack
 Grizzly Teddy

Production 
Director Ted Nicolaou was approached to direct Puppet Master vs Demonic Toys upon the recommendation of Charles Band. Intended to serve as a made-for-TV Christmas horror special for the SyFy Channel, the film is a crossover with the Puppet Master series. Nicolaou was not a fan of the series since he "like[d] working with people, not with puppets", but wanted to direct as he had not had the chance to direct "in quite a long time". Filming took place in Bugaria and had a limited budget.

Release
Puppet Master vs. Demonic Toys was released to the Syfy Channel on December 18, 2004 and received a DVD release on January 17, 2006.

Reception 
The film critic, Scott Weinberg wrote a negative review for Puppet Master vs. Demonic Toys on DVD Talk, writing that it was "not funny, it's not scary, and it's certainly not a worthwhile way to spend 90 minutes of the time you're given on this planet." Dread Central covered the film in a retrospective of the Puppet Master series, writing that "This made for TV movie isn’t considered canon, but it is a vast improvement over The Legacy." Comicbook.com has also reviewed the movie, calling it "gleefully, self-consciously awful. It's amazing."

The director, Ted Nicolaou was critical of Puppet Master vs. Demonic Toys in a 2017 interview with Video Fugue as he felt that it was "kind of a big mistake, I think, in a lot of ways".

References

External links
 
 

2004 horror films
2004 television films
2004 films
2000s Christmas horror films
Puppet films
Television sequel films
Syfy original films
Films about sentient toys
Films set in 2004
Horror crossover films
American Christmas horror films
2000s English-language films
American supernatural horror films
American horror television films
Demonic Toys films
Full Moon Features films
Puppet Master (film series)
Films shot in Bulgaria
Films directed by Ted Nicolaou
Sentient toys in fiction
2000s American films